The Fortaleza Brazil Temple is a temple of the Church of Jesus Christ of Latter-day Saints (LDS Church) in Fortaleza, Brazil.

History
The intent to construct the temple was announced by church president Thomas S. Monson on October 3, 2009, during the church's semi-annual general conference. The temple was announced concurrently with the Brigham City Utah, Concepción Chile, Fort Lauderdale Florida and Sapporo Japan temples.  At the time, they brought the total number of temples worldwide to 151.  At the time of its dedication, it was the church's 164th temple and the seventh in Brazil.

As of May 2014, government approval had been granted for the temple's redesigned plans, with permission to begin construction. A general contractor was being hired to commence with full-scale operations. Although a groundbreaking ceremony, presided over by David A. Bednar, was held in November 2011, the original double-tower design of the temple was denied due to nonconformance to the city plan, leading to the decision to redesign.

On January 10, 2019, the LDS Church announced that a public open house is scheduled to be held from April 27 through May 19, 2019, excluding Sundays. The temple was dedicated by Ulisses Soares on June 2, 2019.

In 2020, the Fortaleza Brazil Temple was closed temporarily during the year in response to the coronavirus pandemic.

See also

 Comparison of temples of The Church of Jesus Christ of Latter-day Saints
 List of temples of The Church of Jesus Christ of Latter-day Saints
 List of temples of The Church of Jesus Christ of Latter-day Saints by geographic region
 Temple architecture (Latter-day Saints)
 The Church of Jesus Christ of Latter-day Saints in Brazil

References

External links

Fortaleza Brazil Temple Official site (Official in English)
Templo de Fortaleza Brasil Official site (Official in Portuguese)
Fortaleza Brazil Temple at ChurchofJesusChristTemples.org

21st-century Latter Day Saint temples
Buildings and structures in Ceará
Buildings and structures in Fortaleza
Temples (LDS Church) completed in 2019
Temples (LDS Church) in Brazil